The 1986 New York City Marathon was the 17th edition of the New York City Marathon and took place in New York City on 2 November.

Results

Men 
 Antoni Niemczak of Poland finished 2nd but was later disqualified after a positive doping test.

Women

References

Results. Association of Road Racing Statisticians. Retrieved 2020-04-24.

External links

New York City Marathon, 1986
Marathon
New York City Marathon
New York